L18, L-18 or L.18 may refer to:

Vehicles 
Aircraft
 Albatros L 18, a German biplane
 Lockheed L-18 Lodestar, an American passenger aircraft
 L18, a United States Navy L-class blimp
 Piper L-18, an American light aircraft
Ships
 , a submarine of the Royal Navy
 , a sloop of the Royal Navy
 , a destroyer of the Royal Navy
 , a tank landing ship of the Indian Navy
 , a Leninets-class submarine

Other uses 
 60S ribosomal protein L18
 Fallbrook Community Airpark, in San Diego County, California
 Lectionary 18, a 12th-century, Greek manuscript of the New Testament 
 Mitochondrial ribosomal protein L18
 Nissan L18 engine, an automobile engine